Danny Williams (born 1 October 1986) is an Australian former professional rugby league footballer who previously played for the Canterbury-Bankstown Bulldogs and the Sydney Roosters.

Early life
Williams was born in Ipswich, Queensland, Australia.

Williams attended highschool in Mackay and played juniors with Brothers Bulldogs JRLFC before playing a grade for Mackay Souths until he signed up with Sydney Roosters at the age of 16.
After attending an Australian school boys tour in England in November 2003, Williams moved to Bondi with partner Laura, to begin his first grade career.

Playing career
Williams made his debut for the Sydney Roosters in Round 13 2007 against North Queensland.  Williams scored his first and only try in his NRL career for Canterbury in a Round 6 30-18 win over the St George Illawarra Dragons on 19 April 2008.

References

External links

Bulldogs profile

1986 births
Living people
Australian rugby league players
Canterbury-Bankstown Bulldogs players
Newtown Jets NSW Cup players
Rugby league players from Ipswich, Queensland
Rugby league props
Rugby league second-rows
Sydney Roosters players